This list shows places located wholly or partly within the Royal Borough of Greenwich in southeast London, United Kingdom. Places in italics are partly outside the borough. Places in bold have their own articles with that title; places not in bold are either redirects to other place articles that encompass them, or have no article at all.

The chart shows the electoral wards, the United Kingdom constituencies, and the postcodes the places are located within. For places only partly in the borough, the chart shows the wards, constituencies, and postcodes that only cover parts of other boroughs in italics.

The borough is predominantly in the SE postcode area, with some small sections in the BR and DA postcode areas. Postcode areas SE7 and SE18 are fully contained within the Royal Borough of Greenwich. While SE2, SE3, SE8, SE9, SE10, SE12, SE13, SE18, SE28, DA15, DA16 and BR5 are partly within the borough. The national dialing code 020 covers the entire borough.

The borough contains two constituencies, Eltham, and Greenwich and Woolwich in full, and shares a third, Erith and Thamesmead with the London Borough of Bexley. Since the 2010 General Election, all three are represented by Labour MPs.

References

Lists of places in London
Districts of the Royal Borough of Greenwich